Higor is a given name. It may refer to:

 Higor Pires (born 1980), Japanese futsal goalkeeper
 Higor Coimbra (born 1987), Brazilian football striker
 Higor Leite (born 1993), Brazilian football midfielder
 Higor (footballer, born 1998), Higor Felippe Borges Felix, Brazilian football forward
 Higor Meritão (born 1994), Brazilian football defensive midfielder
 Higor Alves (born 1994), Brazilian long jumper
 Higor Vidal (born 1996), Brazilian football attacking midfielder
 Higor de Souza (born 1998), Brazilian futsal pivot

See also
 Igor (given name)